Lieutenant General Charles Wilson Bagnal (April 15, 1934 – June 30, 2015) was a United States Army officer. He was commander of the United States Army Western Command (later United States Army Pacific), from 1985 to 1989. Previously he was Deputy Commanding General for Training of the United States Army Training and Doctrine Command (TRADOC), Deputy Superintendent at the United States Military Academy (from 1977 to 1980), Commander of the 101st Airborne Division (1981-1983), Commander of the Officer Personnel Management Directorate for the United States Army Military Personnel Center, and  Special Assistant to the Deputy Chief of Staff for Personnel. He is an alumnus of the United States Military Academy, United States Army Command & General Staff College, Georgia Tech, the United States Army War College and McLenaghan High School in Florence, South Carolina (class of 1952). He retired August 31, 1989, and later obtained his juris doctor from the University of South Carolina and practiced law. He resided in Columbia with his wife Patsy. Bagnal died on June 30, 2015 after a battle with leukemia. He was interred at the U.S. Military Academy Cemetery on July 14, 2015.

Awards and decorations

References

1934 births
2015 deaths
People from Darlington County, South Carolina
United States Military Academy alumni
United States Army personnel of the Vietnam War
Georgia Tech alumni
American Master Army Aviators
Recipients of the Distinguished Flying Cross (United States)
Recipients of the Gallantry Cross (Vietnam)
Recipients of the Legion of Merit
Recipients of the Silver Star
Recipients of the Air Medal
United States Army Command and General Staff College alumni
United States Army War College alumni
United States Military Academy faculty
United States Army generals
Recipients of the Distinguished Service Medal (US Army)
University of South Carolina School of Law alumni
South Carolina lawyers
20th-century American lawyers
People from Columbia, South Carolina
Burials at West Point Cemetery